In economics, a durable good or a hard good or consumer durable is a good that does not quickly wear out or, more specifically, one that yields utility over time rather than being completely consumed in one use. Items like bricks could be considered perfectly durable goods because they should theoretically never wear out. Highly durable goods such as refrigerators or cars usually continue to be useful for several years of use, so durable goods are typically characterized by long periods between successive purchases.

Durable goods are known to form an imperative part of economic production. This can be exemplified from the fact that personal expenditures on durables exceeded the total value of $800 billion in 2000. In the year 2000 itself, durable goods production composed of approximately 60 percent of aggregate production within the manufacturing sector in the United States.

Examples of consumer durable goods include bicycles, books, household goods (home appliances, consumer electronics, furniture, tools, etc.), sports equipment, jewelry, medical equipment, and toys.

Nondurable goods or soft goods (consumables) are the opposite of durable goods. They may be defined either as goods that are immediately consumed in one use or ones that have a lifespan of less than three years.

Examples of nondurable goods include fast-moving consumer goods such as cosmetics and cleaning products, food, condiments, fuel, beer, cigarettes and tobacco, medication, office supplies, packaging and containers, paper and paper products, personal products, rubber, plastics, textiles, clothing, and footwear.

While durable goods can usually be rented as well as bought, nondurable goods generally are not rented.

Durability 
According to Cooper (1994, p5) "durability is the ability of a product to perform its required function over a lengthy period under normal conditions of use without excessive expenditure on maintenance or repair". Several units may be used to measure the durability of a product according to its field of application such as years of existence, hours of use and operational cycles.

Product life spans and sustainable consumption 

The life span of household goods is significant for sustainable consumption. The longer product life spans could contribute to eco-efficiency and sufficiency, thus slowing consumption in order to progress towards a sustainable consumption. Cooper (2005) proposed a model to demonstrate the crucial role of product life spans for sustainable production and consumption.

Durability, as a characteristic relating to the quality of goods that can be demanded by consumers, was not clear until an amendment of the law in 1994 relating to the quality standards for supplied goods.

See also 

 Coase conjecture
 Disposable product
 Industrial organization
 Pacman conjecture
 Planned obsolescence
 Putty-putty

References

Goods (economics)
Waste minimisation